On 9 March 2017, a suspect was detained after an axe attack that injured nine persons. The attack began on a train and continued in the main train station in Düsseldorf, Germany. Although the suspect's injuries were too severe to permit investigators to question him, authorities do not see a connection to terrorism.

Attack
 
The assailant was aboard a train when he suddenly began attacking fellow passengers with an axe. A fellow passenger managed to push him off the train, whereupon he attempted to get back on board by kicking and beating against the door. When he was unable to force the door open, he began attacking people in the central train station.

Suspect

The suspect, a 36-year-old man identified by authorities as being an asylum seeker from Kosovo in the former Yugoslavia, who arrived in Germany in 2009, resided in Wuppertal.  Sources describe the attacker as being from Kosovo, a disputed territory formerly part of Yugoslavia. Investigators see no indication that the suspect had a terrorist background.

The attacker fled the scene, then jumped from a nearby bridge while attempting to escape capture, injuring himself when he jumped.  He was injured too severely to permit authorities to question him in the immediate aftermath of the attack.

Police describe the attacker as a 2009 asylum seeker from Kosovo who suffers from a "psychological disorder." In October 2017, the perpetrator was declared incapable by court. He is now permanently housed in a locked-ward psychiatry.

Similar attacks
In the similar 2016 Würzburg train attack an asylum seeker from Afghanistan attacked 5 people on a train near Würzburg, Germany.

References

2010s in Düsseldorf
Attacks on railway stations
Axe attacks
Crime in North Rhine-Westphalia
Events in Düsseldorf
March 2017 crimes in Europe
Mass stabbings in Germany
Stabbing attacks in 2017
Violence in Germany
March 2017 events in Germany